Norfolk Island has competed in eight of the eighteen Commonwealth Games, from 1986 onwards.

Norfolk Island has won two bronze medals, both in lawn bowls. Carmen Anderson won a bronze in the women's singles at the 1994 Commonwealth Games, while Ryan Dixon, Hadyn Evans, and Phillip Jones won bronze in the men's triples at the 2018 Commonwealth Games.

Overall medal tally

Athletes from Norfolk Island
Malcolm Champion of New Zealand was born on Norfolk Island. He won a gold medal for Australasia in the 1912 Summer Olympics, swimming in the 4 × 200 metre freestyle relay.

See also
Sport in Norfolk Island

References

 
Nations at the Commonwealth Games